Ala al-Din Ali ibn Shuja al-Din Mohammad, also known as Zia' al-Din Ali (ضیاء الدین), was the last Sultan of the Ghurid dynasty from 1214 to 1215. He was the cousin and successor of Ala al-Din Atsiz.

Biography 
Zia al-Din Ali was the son Shuja al-Din Muhammad and a princess known as Malek-ye Hajji. During his early years, Zia al-Din Ali was appointed as governor of Khorasan in ca. 1199/1200 by his cousin Ghiyath al-Din Muhammad. Ghiyath later died in 1202, and was succeeded by his brother Mu'izz al-Din Muhammad, who shortly appointed Ala al-Din Ali as the governor of Ghur, Gharchistan and Zamindawar. Ala al-Din Ali later lead a campaign against the Ismailis in Quhistan.

After the death of Mu'izz al-Din Muhammad in 1206, Ala al-Din Ali was dismissed by the new Sultan Ghiyath al-Din Mahmud, who had him imprisoned in a fortress in Gharchistan. Ala al-Din Ali, however, was later freed by the ghulam Taj al-Din Yildiz, who crowned him as the Sultan of the Ghurid dynasty. After a year Taj al-Din Yildiz was forced to surrender Firozkoh to the Khwarazmian dynasty, and Ala al-Din Ali was captured by a Khwarazmian army and was brought to Khwarazm, where he lived in an honorable exile in Khwarazm. Ala al-Din Ali died a few years later.

Sources 

 

13th-century Iranian people
12th-century Iranian people
Ghurid dynasty
13th-century deaths
Year of birth unknown